The Poteau Community Building, in Poteau in Le Flore County in southeastern Oklahoma, is a multipurpose community building built as Works Progress Administration project in 1937.  It was listed on the National Register of Historic Places in 1988.

It is a two-story  structure made of rusticated and coursed native sandstone with exterior chimneys at each end.

It was one of multiple WPA-related properties studied as a group in 1985, many of which were then listed on the National Register.

References

National Register of Historic Places in Le Flore County, Oklahoma
Buildings and structures completed in 1937
LeFlore County, Oklahoma